Shin Daewe (born Cho Cho Hnin in 1973) is a Burmese documentary filmmaker. She is one of the pioneering female documentary filmmakers in Myanmar. She was named in The Irrawaddy 's "Inspiring Women of Burma".

Career
Shin Daewe was an active activist, involved in many protests in the 8888 Uprising. She was jailed for one month in 1990 and one year in 1991 for her involvement in demonstrations. While studying at Rangoon University, she initially wrote poems and works of fiction that were published in magazines during the 1990s. However, she was also fascinated by the medium of film. Between 1997 and 2000, Shin Daewe worked as an assistant producer at Audio Visual (AV) Media, which was Burma's first private documentary film company.

She began her film career in 2007 after attending a workshop at the Yangon Film School, a non-profit organization based in Berlin. Having worked as a video journalist with the Democratic Voice of Burma (DVB) between 2005 and 2010, Shin Daewe was present during the 2007 Saffron Revolution and made the documentary "Burma VJ", which exposed the wider Burmese public to the power of documentaries. One of Shin Daewe's most renowned works is her 2008 documentary "Rahula", which follows the story of a Mandalay-based sculptor. Her film "Take Me Home", which is a story about ethnic Kachin villagers who were displaced by conflict in northern Burma, won the Wathan Film Festival. Her other successful film, "Brighter Future", depicts the story of Phaung Daw Oo Monastic Education High School in Mandalay and won the Best Documentary award at the Art of Freedom Film Festival, in 2009.

In 2013, Shin Daewe directed a 15-minute documentary titled "Now I am 13," which depicts the struggles of a teenage girl from central Burma who was deprived of educational opportunities due to poverty. This documentary earned her the Silver Award at the Kota Kinabalu International Film Festival and the Award for Best Documentary at the Wathann Film Festival in 2014. She also documented the student protests against Burma's National Education Bill in 2015. She has made more than 15 short documentaries that have been shown at international film festivals.

References 

Living people
1973 births
Burmese producers
People from Yangon
Burmese women writers
Burmese film producers
Burmese film directors
Burmese film people